Lopo Gomes de Abreu (1420–70s?) was a Portuguese nobleman, Lord of Regalados.

Biography 

Lopo was the son of Pedro Gomes de Abreu (3rd Lord of Regalados) and Aldonça de Sousa, descendant of Afonso III of Portugal. His wife was Inês de Soutomaior, daughter of Leonel de Lima and Filipa da Cunha, descendant of Leonor Telles de Meneses. 

Lopo Gomes de Abreu was a direct descendant of Gonçalo Martins de Abreu nobleman born in the 11th-century in France.

References

External links 
acer-pt.org

1420 births
1460s deaths
15th-century Portuguese people
Portuguese nobility
Portuguese Roman Catholics
Portuguese people of French descent